Silla is an Italian-language opera in three acts by Carl Heinrich Graun to a libretto by Frederick II of Prussia, Frederick the Great, with Italian verses by Giovanni Pietro Tagliazucchi. It was first performed at the Hofoper unter den Linden, Berlin, on 27 March 1753.

Performances and recordings
Silla conducted by Alessandro De Marchi at Tiroler Landestheater, Festwochen Alte Musik, Innsbruck 2022

References

External links
 
 Libretto, Library of Congress

1753 operas
Operas by Carl Heinrich Graun
Italian-language operas
Operas set in ancient Rome
Cultural depictions of Sulla
Operas